Matthäus Waissel (c. 1540–1602) was a German lutenist, editor of music, and writer. Waissel was from 1573 headmaster of a school at Schippenbeil near Königsberg; he published in that year a volume of lute arrangements of vocal pieces, and in 1592 he issued a collection of German dances for lute, which signaled the decline of German lute tablature as it yielded prominence to the so-called French system. Waissel's output comprises three books of solo lute music in all, and one collection of duets. It is unlikely though that any of the pieces in these collections are his own compositions. Waissel's chief importance arguably lies in his expansion of the passamezzo/saltarello pairing into full suites that in form, if not title, comprise some of the earliest true dance suites.

Besides his publications of lute tabulatures, he also published a collection of biblical tales in 1596, and a chronicle of East Prussia in 1599.

His son, also named Matthäus, became a musician, too. In 1598 he was instrumentalist at Riga, and from 1616 to 1619 he was a member of the Königsberg court chapel.

Works 
1573, Frankfurt an der Oder
1591, Frankfurt an der Oder
1592, Frankfurt an der Oder
1592, Frankfurt an der Oder (Andreas Eichorn)
1596, 
1599,  Durch Matthaeum Waisselium

Recordings
 Jacob Heringman - Black Cow. Lute music by Valentin Bakfark and Matthäus Waissel 1999, Magnatune
 Konrad Ragossnig - European Lute Music from England, Italy, Spain, Germany etc. 2000, Deutsche Grammophon

References
 .
 

16th-century births
1602 deaths
Sheet music publishers (people)
Lutenists
German classical musicians